TVP HD is a special High Definition version of the Polish public broadcasting channels (Telewizja Polska). A digital terrestrial multiplex carrying the channel was available in Warsaw, Poznań, Zielona Góra, Żagań, Kraków, Leżajsk and Krosno from the 6 to 25 August 2008.

It was launched in August 2008. Broadcast is 1080i video encoded with MPEG4/H.264.

It is encrypted on Satellite (Hot Bird 13C at 13° east), with 18 hours of daily HD content. During the Olympic Games, the signal replaced TVP Polonia, TVP Historia and TVP Kultura.

References

TVR HD
Rai HD

External links

TVP HD at LyngSat Address
TVP unveils Olympic DTT/HD plans : Broadband TV News
TVP HD z naziemnych nadajników (polish)
TVP Encrypted on Astra
TVP HD broadcast trials (Astra) (polish)

High-definition television
Telewizja Polska
Television channels and stations established in 2008
Television channels in Poland